The Volcae were a Gallic tribal confederation constituted before the raid of combined Gauls that invaded Macedonia c. 270 BC and fought the assembled Greeks at the Battle of Thermopylae in 279 BC. Tribes known by the name Volcae were found simultaneously in southern Gaul, Moravia, the Ebro valley of the Iberian Peninsula, and Galatia in Anatolia. The Volcae appear to have been part of the late La Tène material culture, and a Celtic identity has been attributed to the Volcae, based on mentions in Greek and Latin sources as well as onomastic evidence. Driven by highly mobile groups operating outside the tribal system and comprising diverse elements, the Volcae were one of the new ethnic entities formed during the Celtic military expansion at the beginning of the 3rd century BC. Collecting in the famous excursion into the Balkans, ostensibly, from the Greek point of view, to raid Delphi, a branch of the Volcae split from the main group on the way into the Balkans and joined two other tribes, the Tolistobogii and the Trocmi, to settle in central Anatolia and establish a new identity as the Galatians.

The Tectosagii were a group of the Volcae who moved through Macedonia into Anatolia c. 277 BC. Strabo says the Tectosagii came originally from the region near modern Toulouse, in France.

Name
They are mentioned as Volcis and Volcarum by Caesar (mid-1st c. BC), as Ou̓ólkai (Οὐόλκαι) by Strabo (early 1st c. AD) and Ptolemy (2nd c. AD), and as Volce on the Tabula Peutingeriana (4–5th c. AD).

Most modern Celtologists regard the tribal name Uolcae (sing. Uolcos) as stemming from a Gaulish noun uolcos, uolca ('hawk, falcon'), which can be compared with the Welsh gwalch ('hawk, rascal' > 'fighter'). In particular, the Gaulish personal name Catu-uolcos has an exact parallel in the Welsh cadwalch ('hero, champion, warrior'), itself from an earlier Old Brittonic *katu-wealkos ('battle-hawk'). The Gaulish stem uolc- can also be found in the personal names Uolcius, Uolcenius, Uolcenia, Uolcinius, Uolcacius, Uolciani, and Uolcanus. The Old English wealc- ('hawk'), which has no known cognate in other Germanic languages, was most likely borrowed from Old Brittonic *wealkos. The etymology of those forms remains obscure. Xavier Delamarre has proposed to derive Gaulish uolcos – alongside Latin falcō ('falcon') and falx, falcis ('hook, sickle') – from a stem *ǵhwol-k-, itself based on the Proto-Indo-European (PIE) root *ǵʷhel- ('bend, curve'). In this view, the animal may have been named after the shape of his beak, just like the Ancient Greek harpē designates both a sickle and a bird of prey. 

Alternatively, the name Uolcae has been derived by some scholars from the PIE name of the wolf, *wḷkʷos. According to Ranko Matasović, however, this is unlikely since the Gaulish form would have preserved the o-grade *wolkʷo-; he argues that descendants of Proto-Celtic *ulkʷos ('bad, evil' < PIE *wḷkʷos 'wolf') rather include Lepontic Ulkos and Old Irish olc ('bad, evil'). Delamarre finds it doubtful since *wḷkʷos would have given **flech (rather than olc) in Old Irish and **ulipos in Gaulish (after the P-Celtic sound shift). John T. Koch derives Old Irish olc from a Proto-Celtic form *elko- ~ *olko-, which may be compared with Old Norse illr (from Proto-Germanic *elhja- < Pre-Germanic *elkyo-; cf. the Finnish loanword elkiä 'mean, malicious'); he proposes that reflexes of PIE *wḷkʷos ('wolf') include Old Irish foilc (from a 9th-century poem) and Old Welsh gueilc[h] (from the poem Y Gododdin).  

After Volcae Tectosages settled in the Hercynian forest (Central Europe), neighbouring Germanic tribes designated them by the name *walhaz, a loanword from Gaulish uolcos that came to refer more generally to Celtic and Romance speakers in medieval Germanic languages (e.g. Welsh, Waals, Vlachs).

Volcae of the Danube

Julius Caesar was convinced that the Volcae had originally been settled east of the Rhine, for he mentioned the Volcae Tectosages as a Gaulish tribe which still remained in western Germany in his day (Gallic War 6.24):

Caesar related a tradition associating the Celtic tribe of the Volcae to the vast Hercynian Forest, although they were possibly located in the eastern range of the České Středohoří; yet, Volcae of his time were settled in Moravia, east of the Boii.  Their apparent movement may indicate that the Volcae were newcomers to the region.  Caesar's remark  about the wealth of this region may have referred not only to agriculture but also to the mineral deposits there, while the renown attributed to the Volcae "in peace and in war" resulted from their metallurgical skills and the quality of their weapons, both attracting the attention of their northern neighbors.  Together with the Boii in the upper basin of the Elbe river to the west and the Cotini in Slovakia to the east, this area of Celtic settlement in oppida led to the exploitation of natural resources on a grand scale and the concentration of skilled craftsmen under the patronage of strong and wealthy chieftains.  This culture flourished from the mid second to the mid-1st century BCE, until it buckled under the combined pressure of the Germanic peoples from the North and the Dacians from the East.

Allowance must be made for Julius Caesar's usual equation of primitive poverty with admirable hardihood and military prowess and his connection of luxurious imports and the proximity of "civilization", meaning his own, with softness and decadence. In fact, long-established trading connections furnished Gaulish elites with Baltic amber and Greek and Etruscan wares.

Caesar took it as a given that the Celts in the Hercynian Forest were emigrant settlers from Gaul who had "seized" the land, but modern archeology identifies the region as part of the La Tène homeland. As Henry Howarth noted a century ago, "The Tectosages reported by Caesar as still being around the Hercynian forest were in fact living in the old homes of their race, whence a portion of them set out on their great expedition against Greece, and eventually settled in Galatia, in Asia Minor, where one of the tribes was called Tectosages."

Volcae of Gaul

Volcae Arecomici
The Volcae Arecomici ( of Ptolemy's Geography ii), according to Strabo, dwelt on the western side of the lower Rhône, with their metropolis at Narbo (Narbonne): "Narbo is spoken of as the naval-station of these people alone, though it would be fairer to add 'and of the rest of Celtica', so greatly has it surpassed the others in the number of people who use it as a trade-centre." They were not alone in occupying their territory, with its capital at Nemausus (Nîmes).

The Volcae Arecomici of their own accord surrendered to the Roman Republic in 121 BC. They occupied the district between the Garonne (Garumna), the Cévennes (Cebenna mons), and the Rhône. This area covered most of the western part of the Roman province of Gallia Narbonensis. They held their assemblies in the sacred wood of Nemausus, the site of modern Nîmes.

In Gaul they were divided into two tribes in widely separated regions, the Arecomici on the east, living among the Ligures, and the Tectosages (whose territory included that of the Tolosates) on the west, living among the Aquitani; the territories were separated by the Hérault (Arauris) or a line between the Hérault and the Orb (Orbis).

Volcae Tectosages

West of the Arecomici the Volcae Tectosages (whose territory included that of the Tolosates) lived among the Aquitani; the territories were separated by the Hérault (Arauris) or a line between the Hérault River and the Orb (Orbis). Strabo says the Volcae Tectosages came originally from the region near modern Toulouse and were part of the Volcae.

The territory of the Volcae Tectosages (Οὐόλκαι Τεκτόσαγες of Ptolemy's Geography ii) in Gaul lay outside the Roman Republic, to the southwest of the Volcae Arecomici. From the 3rd century BC, the capital city of the Volcae Tectosages was Tolosa (Toulouse). When the Cimbri and Teutones invaded Gaul, the Tectosages allied themselves with them, and their town Tolosa was sacked in retribution by Quintus Servilius Caepio in 106 BC. Tolosa was incorporated into the Roman Republic as part of the province of Gallia Aquitania with the conquest of Gaul by Julius Caesar in 52 BC. The Roman conquest of Tolosa ended the cultural identity of the Volcae Tectosages.

According to Ptolemy's Geography, their inland towns were Illiberis, Ruscino, Tolosa colonia, Cessero, Carcaso, Baetirae, and Narbo colonia.

The Volcae Tectosages were among the successful raiders of the Delphi expedition and were said to have transported their booty to Tolosa. A significant part of these raiders however did not return and crossed the Bosporus instead. As a result, Tectosages was also the name of one of the three great communities of Gauls who invaded and settled in Anatolia in the country called after them "Galatia".

Venceslas Kruta suggests that their movement into this region was probably motivated by a Carthaginian recruiting post situated close by, a main attraction of the region for Celtic mercenaries eager for more campaigning. Indeed, after crossing the Pyrenees in 218 BC, Hannibal in travelling through southern Gaul was greeted by warlike tribes: the Volcae, the Arverni, the Allobroges, and the Gaesatae of the Rhône Valley, who rose to prominence around the middle of the 3rd century BC.  From around that time, this part of Gaul underwent a process of stabilization buttressed by the formation of new and powerful tribal confederations as well as the development of new-style settlements, such as Tolosa and Nemausus (Nîmes), resembling the urban centers of the Mediterranean world.

In 107, the Volcae, allies of the Tigurini, a branch of the Helvetii who belonged to a coalition that formed around the Cimbri and the Teutons, defeated a Roman army at Tolosa.  In 106-5, Q. Servilius Caepio was sent with an army to put down the revolt, and as a result, Tolosa was sacked, and thereafter the town and its territory were absorbed into Gallia Narbonensis, thereby establishing firm control over the western Gallic trade corridor along the Carcassonne Gap and the Garonne.

The Volcae were highly influential in Moravia, and together with the Boii and the Cotini and other Danubian tribes, they controlled a highly active network of trade routes connected to the Mediterranean and the German lands.

Notes

References

Further reading
John King, Celt Kingdoms
Ptolemy, Geography at Lacus Curtius site
 William Smith, Dictionary of Greek and Roman Geography (1854)

Historical Celtic peoples
Tribes of pre-Roman Gaul
Gauls
Ancient Galatia
History of Toulouse
Tribes conquered by Rome